Marcelo Arévalo González (born October 17, 1990) is a Salvadoran professional tennis player. He has been ranked as high as world No. 5 in doubles by the Association of Tennis Professionals (ATP), which he first achieved on 14 November 2022. Together with his career-high singles ranking of world No. 139, attained in April 2018, Arévalo is the highest-ranked player, male or female, across both disciplines in Salvadoran tennis history.

He has won eight career ATP Tour doubles titles, including a Grand Slam title at the 2022 French Open with partner Jean-Julien Rojer. With the win, he became the first player from Central America to claim a men's doubles major title. He had previously reached one other Grand Slam final, having lost at the 2021 US Open in the mixed doubles tournament with partner Giuliana Olmos.

As a junior, Arévalo was ranked as high as No. 8 in the world and won seven singles and doubles titles on the ITF Junior Circuit. 

As a professional, he emerged into the top 100 in 2018 and won his first ATP title at the 2018 Los Cabos Open, making his debut in the top 50. After several years with intermittent partners, Arévalo formed a new partnership with Rojer in 2022 that took them to four additional tour finals, three of which they won, and helped him debut in the top 10.

He is the younger brother of former tennis player Rafael Arévalo, who he often partnered with to represent El Salvador together in the Davis Cup.

Professional career

2018: Top 100 debut, Maiden ATP title, top 50
As a professional, he emerged into the top 100 of the doubles rankings in February 2018. He won his first ATP title six months later at the Los Cabos Open, a victory that propelled him into the top 50.

2021: Second career title, first Grand Slam mixed doubles final
2021 was the most successful year on the ATP tour in Arevalo's professional doubles career. He reached in the end of March the quarterfinals in the 2021 Miami Open with Horia Tecau defeating the top seeded pair of Farah/Cabal.

With his Dutch partner Matwé Middelkoop, the pair reached the quarterfinals of the Australian Open (his second in a row) and the semifinals of the Italian Open as alternates, defeating home favorites Fognini/Musetti in the round of 16 and 7th seeded Dutch pair Koolhof/Rojer in the quarterfinals. As a result he returned to the top 50 in the doubles rankings at a career-high ranking of World No. 42 on 17 May 2021.

Again as an alternate pair with Fabio Fognini, Arevalo reached the semifinals of the Cincinnati Open where they were defeated by No. 2 seeded pair Zeballos/Granollers. As a result he reached a new career-high ranking of world No. 39 on 23 August 2021.

At the Winston-Salem Open, Arévalo won the title partnering Matwé Middelkoop when they defeated Ivan Dodig and Austin Krajicek in the final. This was his first title in over three years and second of his career. As a result he reached a new career-high ranking of World No. 36 on 30 August 2021.

At the US Open, following a first round loss in the men's doubles draw, Arévalo partnered Giuliana Olmos in the mixed doubles draw and reached the final by defeating top seeds Nicole Melichar-Martinez and Ivan Dodig en route. They lost to second seeded pair Desirae Krawczyk and Joe Salisbury in straight sets. Arevalo became the first player from El Salvador to ever reach a Grand Slam final.

2022-23: New partnership with Rojer, Historic Major doubles title, World No. 5
After wrapping up 2021 with Middelkoop, Arévalo joined with Jean-Julien Rojer for a new doubles partnership for the 2022 season. Arevalo reached the top 30 on 17 January 2022. With no title wins during the Australian swing, they moved onto the inaugural Dallas Open in February as the top seeds, where they clinched their first title together as a team without dropping a set after defeating Lloyd Glasspool and Harri Heliövaara.
The pair carried their momentum into the following week as the top seeds at the Delray Beach Open and they sealed their second consecutive title together, having dropped just one set in the championship match to Aleksandr Nedovyesov and Aisam-ul-Haq Qureshi. Arevalo reached the top 25 on 21 February 2022. Their winning streak extended yet another week as they reached their third consecutive final and their biggest one as a team thus far, the ATP 500 in Acapulco, but they were halted in straight sets by Feliciano López and Stefanos Tsitsipas. 
Although the team started off their European clay swing strongly by reaching the semifinals in Monte Carlo and Barcelona, they did not make a final.

At the French Open, the twelfth seeds reached their maiden Grand Slam championship match together to vie for their first Major title as a team, defeating 16th seeds Rohan Bopanna and Matwe Middelkoop also first time semifinalists. In the final, they faced Ivan Dodig and Austin Krajicek, who, after winning the first set in a tiebreak, had three championship points on Rojer's serve in the second set. But after Arévalo and Rojer saved those decisive points and closed the second set in another tiebreak, they went on to convert their first break point opportunity in the third set and continued to hold serve to seal off the match for their third victory of the season. Arévalo's maiden Grand Slam win made him the first player from Central America to become a men's doubles major champion. As a result he moved onto the top 10 in the rankings on 13 June 2022. The pair won their fourth title as a team at the 2022 Stockholm Open. He reached a new career-high of World No. 5 on 14 November 2022.

World TeamTennis
Arévalo made his World TeamTennis debut in 2020 by joining the Washington Kastles when the WTT season began July 12 at The Greenbrier.

Grand Slam finals

Doubles: 1 (1 title)

Mixed doubles: 1 (1 runner-up)

ATP career finals

Doubles: 12 (8 titles, 4 runner-ups)

Performance timeline

Doubles

Challenger and Futures finals

Singles: 25 (14–11)

Doubles: 59 (35–24)

Davis Cup

Participations: (45–30)

   indicates the outcome of the Davis Cup match followed by the score, date, place of event, the zonal classification and its phase, and the court surface.

Notes

References

External links
 
 
 

1990 births
Living people
Salvadoran male tennis players
Sportspeople from San Salvador
Tennis players at the 2015 Pan American Games
Tennis players at the 2011 Pan American Games
Pan American Games competitors for El Salvador
Central American and Caribbean Games bronze medalists for El Salvador
Competitors at the 2010 Central American and Caribbean Games
Central American and Caribbean Games medalists in tennis
Tennis players at the 2007 Pan American Games
Tulsa Golden Hurricane men's tennis players